Howzat! Kerry Packer's War is an Australian drama-miniseries set in the 1970s that premiered on the Nine Network on Sunday 19 August 2012.

Plot
The Ashes is the pinnacle of world cricket with two old enemies, Australia and England, going head to head. This series is the story of World Series Cricket and its creator, Australian media mogul Kerry Packer, who signed up the world's greatest players and set up a parallel cricket competition.

The Australian cricket team, visiting England in 1977 for the Ashes series, fields a team full of legends. Cricket is undergoing a revolution and the cricket establishment will be brought to its knees.

Cast

 Lachy Hulme as media mogul Kerry Packer
 Travis McMahon as comedian Paul Hogan
 Abe Forsythe as comedian John Cornell (known also as 'strop').
 Cariba Heine as an actress (and wife of John Cornell) Delvene Delaney.
 Peter Houghton as former Australian cricket captain (and also an adviser to Kerry Packer), Richie Benaud.
 Clayton Watson as Australia XI captain Ian Chappell
 Damon Gameau as Australia XI batsman Greg Chappell.
 Matthew Le Nevez as Australia XI fast bowler Dennis Lillee.
 Ryan O'Kane as Australia XIfast bowler Jeff Thomson.
 Brendan Cowell as Australia XI wicket-keeper Rod Marsh.
 Richard Davies as Australia XI Batsman David Hookes.
 Nicholas Coghlan as journalist Austin Robertson Jr.
 Alexander England as England and Rest Of The World XI captain Tony Greig.
 Andrew Carbone as Australia XI fast bowler Max Walker.
 Russell Newman as Harry Chester.
 Tony Briggs as West Indies XI captain Clive Lloyd.
 Daniel Worrall as Australia XI bowler Mick Malone.
 Craig Hall as Gavin Warner (fictional character)
 Mandy McElhinney as Kerry Packer's personal assistant, Rose (fictional character)

Ratings

Accolades

Book
Howzat! Kerry Packer's War, is also a book by Christopher Lee, who wrote the screenplay of the TV series. It was first published in 2012 by New South Publishing, an imprint of The University of New South Wales.

See also

 World Series Cricket
 Cricket World Cup
 Limited overs cricket
 South African rebel tours
 Power Games: The Packer-Murdoch War

References

External links 
 

Nine Network original programming
2010s Australian television miniseries
Television series by Endemol Australia
Television series by Endemol
Fiction set in the 1970s
Cricket on television
2012 Australian television series debuts
2012 Australian television series endings